Ariana Madix (born June 24, 1985) is an American television personality, actress, model and author. She is a cast member on the Bravo reality television series Vanderpump Rules.

Early life 
Madix was born on June 24, 1985 in Melbourne, Florida and raised by her father Jim and mother Tanya. Her brother Jeremy was born in 1992. According to a Radar Online report, her childhood was unstable. She began riding horses at age 6 and had a competitive equestrian career. She also won two national dance championships.  

She graduated from Eau Gallie High School in 2003. In 2007, she graduated from Flagler College, where she received two bachelor’s degrees: Theatre and Broadcast Communications. She worked as costumed characters such as Ariel, Cinderella and Aurora at Disney World while she was studying in college. She subsequently moved to New York City and began working for College Humor, MTV, and ESPN. She also studied at New York University Tisch School of the Arts.

Career 
Early in her career, she was frequently cast in videos for comedy website CollegeHumor. She has appeared in guest roles on several television series, including Dads, Anger Management, Single Siblings and Waking Up with Strangers. She has appeared in films Working It Out (2010), Killer Eye: Halloween Haunt (2011), Attack of the 50 Foot Cheerleader (2012), Dirty Dealing 3D (2018) and Dead End (2019).

She started working at Lisa Vanderpump's restaurants SUR and Villa Blanca, which earned her a spot on the reality television series Vanderpump Rules in 2013, following the lives of the SUR, PUMP, and Villa Blanca servers.

In November 2017, she released a holiday lip kit, "Ariana Nudist Lip Set" with Frankie Rose Cosmetics, consisting of three nude-colored lipsticks.

In 2019, she appeared as herself in the comedy television series The Other Two, in the episode "Chase Shoots a Music Video".

On December 3, 2019, Madix and Tom Sandoval released their cocktail book Fancy AF Cocktails: Drink Recipes from a Couple of Professional Drinkers by Houghton Mifflin Harcourt.

Personal life 
In 2018, she had surgery to remove a tumor after being diagnosed with skin cancer. She became an ambassador for The Skin Cancer Foundation and Madix uses her public platform to advocate and bring awareness to skin cancer. She discussed the foundation's services in an episode of E!'s Daily Pop.

In February 2022, Madix revealed that she had been struggling with an eating disorder when she joined Vanderpump Rules but has recovered since.

Filmography

Awards and nominations

Bibliography 

 Madix, Ariana; Sandoval, Tom. Fancy AF Cocktails: Drink Recipes from a Couple of Professional Drinkers. (2019). Houghton Mifflin Harcourt.

References

External links 
 
 ariana2525 on Twitter
 ariana252525 on Instagram

1985 births
Living people
American female models
American television personalities
American women television personalities
21st-century American women